The David Jones House on High St. in Maryville, Tennessee, also known as the Elmer B. Waller House, was built in 1874 by Maryville builder David Jones.  Jones ran a brick company and built numerous brick buildings in Maryville including the Blount County Courthouse (which burned in 1906).

The house is one of two best examples of Italianate architecture, along with the Peter Bartlett House, in Blount County.  It was listed on the National Register of Historic Places (NRHP) in 1989.

David Jones also built the county's only Second Empire style house on Broadway (at 720 Tuckaleechee Pike), which is also NRHP-listed.

See also
David Jones House (Tuckaleechee Pike, Maryville, Tennessee), also NRHP-listed in Maryville

References

Maryville, Tennessee
Houses on the National Register of Historic Places in Tennessee
Italianate architecture in Tennessee
Houses completed in 1874
Houses in Blount County, Tennessee
National Register of Historic Places in Blount County, Tennessee